The Sokol space suit, also known as the Sokol IVA suit or simply the Sokol, is a type of Soviet/Russian space suit, worn by all who fly on the Soyuz spacecraft. It was introduced in 1973 and is still used . The Sokol is described by its makers as a rescue suit and it is not capable of being used outside the spacecraft in a spacewalk or extravehicular activity. Instead, its purpose is to keep the wearer alive in the event of an accidental depressurisation of the spacecraft. In this respect, it is similar to the ACES suit that was worn aboard NASA's Space Shuttle during launch and landing.

Description
The current version of the suit is the Sokol-KV2, manufactured by NPP Zvezda (НПП Звезда). It consists of an inner pressure layer of rubberised polycaprolactam and an outer layer of white nylon canvas. Boots are integrated with the suit but gloves are removable and attach by means of blue anodised aluminium wrist couplings. The polycarbonate visor can open on hinges mounted near the ears and seals with an anodised aluminium clavicle flange when closed; the hood or 'soft helmet' folds when the visor is raised. The suit has four pockets and adjustment straps on the arms, legs, chest, and abdomen.

There is a suit pressure gauge on the left wrist. A mirror on an elastic wrist band is worn on the right—this helps the wearer see things that would otherwise be outside his or her field of view. During re-entry, an altimeter on a wrist strap may also be worn this gives an immediate check on cabin pressure and warns when to brace for touchdown (during the last phase of landing the cabin opens to the outside air.) A wristwatch is often worn as well, with an elastic wrist band replacing the strap so it may fit over the bulky suit glove. The watches are often privately purchased and a wide variety of Swiss and Russian models have been used.

Electrical cables are mounted on the right abdomen of the suit; on the left abdomen there are separate hoses for air and oxygen. Both air and oxygen exhaust through the blue pressure relief valve at the centre of the chest; this valve also regulates the pressure of the suit.

Effectively, the suit uses an open-circuit life support system that somewhat resembles scuba equipment. This has the advantage of simplicity; the disadvantage of a high rate of oxygen consumption is considered acceptable given that it is only intended for emergency use.

Despite this, they are intended to be worn for up to 30 hours in a pressurised environment or two hours in a vacuum. They can also float and have a neck dam that allows the visor to be raised in water without the risk of flooding the suit. However, Soyuz crews are provided with buoyancy aids and cold-water survival suits which would preferably be used if the Soyuz accidentally landed in water.

, a total of 309 flight suits had been made along with 135 training and testing suits.

Operational use

Each Soyuz crew member is provided with a made-to-measure suit for flight although, from the numbers made, it appears that the suits provided for ground training are re-used. It is considered vital that the flight suit fits correctly and the wearer will spend two hours sitting in a launch couch with the suit inflated to make sure of this. Straps on the arms, legs and chest allow the fit to be adjusted slightly.

To don the suit, the two zips that make a 'V' on the chest are opened. Underneath, there is a large tubular opening in the inner pressure layer known as the appendix. Legs go in first, followed by the arms into the sleeves and head into the helmet. When the suit is on, an airtight seal is made by tightly rolling up the appendix and securing it with strong elastic bands. The large bulge of the rolled-up appendix is secured under the V shaped flap in the suit's outer layer. When worn on the ground, the suit is attached to a portable ventilation unit —a hand-held device that supplies air to the suit, cooling it first with an ice filled heat exchanger. Grey leather outer boots are also worn on the ground; they protect the feet of the suit from damage and are removed before entering the spacecraft to avoid carrying debris into the cabin.

The suit is worn during launch and re-entry of the Soyuz spacecraft—the gloves are attached and the visor is sealed at these times. In an emergency, the suit pressure is usually maintained at 400 hPa (0.39 atm, 5.8 psi) above the ambient by the pressure relief valve. However, the suits only have a rudimentary pressure relief layer so they tend to balloon when inflated. Movement of the wearer becomes restricted, although it is still possible to function inside the capsule.

If more than limited movement is required, the pressure relief valve may be adjusted to a lower setting of 270 hPa (0.26 atm, 3.9 psi). Pure oxygen at this pressure will support life, but the setting is only intended for use in extreme emergencies; the risk of decompression sickness becomes significant if the wearer spends more than 15 minutes at the lower pressure setting.

The maximum length of time the suits may be used in a vacuum is 125 minutes. The time is limited because the oxygen flow to the suit is enough for life support, but insufficient to carry away the cosmonaut's body heat and longer use of the suit risks heat exhaustion. If the capsule becomes depressurised, either accidentally or deliberately to extinguish a fire, it must land within that time.

History
Pressure suits were worn on the Vostok space missions, but when the Soyuz spacecraft was being developed in the mid-1960s, the controversial decision was taken by its designers, OKB-1, not to use them on the new spacecraft. Some of the early Soyuz flights carried Yastreb space suits but these were only for space walks and were only worn in orbit.

On June 30, 1971, the crew of Soyuz 11 died when their spacecraft depressurised during re-entry. One of the recommendations of the investigating government commission was that pressure suits should be worn by future crews during critical phases of their mission - launch, docking and landing.

NPP Zvezda was given the task of providing the suits. They rejected the use of existing Soviet space suits and chose to base a new suit on the existing Sokol aviation pressure suit. The main modification was the replacement of the Sokol suit's hard helmet. Other features of the aviation suit that were considered unnecessary were removed to save weight.

At the same time, a life support system was developed in co-operation with OKB-1. The new suit was named the Sokol-K, K (Kosmos) is the abbreviation of the Russian word for space.

Variants

Sokol-K
The first version of the suit, it was used on Soyuz 12, launched on September 27, 1973.

Specifications
Name: Sokol-K Rescue Spacesuit
Derived from: Sokol aviation full pressure suit
Manufacturer: NPP Zvezda
Missions: Soyuz 12 (1973) to Soyuz 40 (1981)
Function: Intravehicular activity (IVA)
Operating Pressure:  
Suit Weight:

Sokol-KR
A version intended for use with the TKS spacecraft which was to be used as part of the Almaz programme. The suit was never used as the TKS never flew with a crew. Its main difference was that it was designed to work with a regenerative life support system.

Sokol-KM and Sokol-KV

Work on improving the Sokol-K began 1973, immediately after its introduction. The Sokol-KM and KV were intermediate models on which many of the features of the Sokol-KV2 were developed, neither was ever used in space.

To be donned, the Sokol-KM and KV split into upper and lower halves joined by zip fasteners. However, this feature was discarded in the Sokol-KV2 and the appendix was retained as a means of donning the suit it was thought to be more reliable than the airtight zippers the Russians were able to make. Other changes included alterations to the fabric around the joints, to improve mobility, and improvement of the gloves, to make it easier to operate the spacecraft controls.

The KM and KV also featured a liquid-cooled undergarment that would increase the comfort of the wearer by efficiently removing body-heat; other suits relied on the flow of air to do this.

Specifications
Name: Sokol-KV Rescue Spacesuit
Manufacturer: NPP Zvezda
Missions: None
Function: Intra-vehicular activity (IVA)
Operating Pressure:  
Suit Weight:

Sokol-KV2  

The Sokol-KV2, the current version of the suit, was first used on the Soyuz T-2 mission, launched on June 5, 1980.

The main improvement was the replacement of the rubber pressure layer of the Sokol-K with rubberised polycaprolactam to save weight. The visor was modified and enlarged to give the wearer a better field of view. Laces in the outer canvas layer were replaced with zippers to make the suit quicker to don and the pressure relief valve was moved from the left abdomen to the centre of the chest so either hand could be used to alter the suit's pressure setting. The improved arms, legs, and gloves of the Sokol-KV were retained although the liquid cooled undergarment of the KM and KV was discarded.

Specifications
Name: Sokol-KV2 Rescue Spacesuit
Manufacturer: NPP Zvezda
Missions: 1980 to present
Function: Intra-vehicular activity (IVA)
Operating Pressure:  
Suit Weight:

Use by countries other than Russia

The People's Republic of China have bought a number of space suits from the Russians for use in their space programme. The suit worn by Yang Liwei on Shenzhou 5, the first crewed Chinese spaceflight, closely resembles a Sokol-KV2 suit, but it is believed to be a Chinese-made version rather than an actual Russian suit. Pictures show that the suits worn by Fei Junlong and Nie Haisheng on Shenzhou 6 differ in detail from the earlier suit; they are also reported to be lighter.

Sokol suits have been bought for uses other than spaceflight. It was planned that the crew of the British QinetiQ 1 high-altitude balloon would wear modified Sokol suits purchased from Zvezda.

Bulgaria developed its own version of the Sokol space suit in the mid-1970s.

U.S. equivalent
During the flight of Gemini 7 in 1965, Frank Borman and Jim Lovell wore modified Gemini spacesuits sharing some similarities with the Sokol suits, but with significant differences. Their suits were known as the G5C by their manufacturer, the David Clark Company.

Collectors' market
Sokol space suits, including ones flown in space, were first sold by Sotheby's at an auction devoted to Russian space history in 1993. Subsequently, components such as gloves, communications caps, and wrist mirrors have frequently come up for sale on eBay; even complete suits have occasionally come up for sale, such as the one that Heritage Auctions sold for US$31,070 in 2009. These are usually worn out items that have been discarded after use during ground training and were never intended for use in space. As these items are nominally the property of the Russian government, the legitimacy of their sale has been questioned.

See also

References
Citations

Bibliography
Isaak P. Abramov, A. Ingemar Skoog, (2003). Russian Space Suits: Springer-Praxsis. .
Helen Sharman Christopher Priest, (1993). Seize the Moment, Gollancz. .
Christopher S. Stuart, 
Sotheby's Catalogue - Russian Space History, sale 6516, December 11, 1993.
Sotheby's Catalogue - Russian Space History, sale 6753, March 16, 1996.

External links

NPP Zvezda's web site
NASA's guide to the clothing of International Space Station crewmembers.

Soyuz program
Soviet and Russian spacesuits